Majuli Assembly constituency is one of the 126 assembly constituencies of  Assam a north east state of India. Majuli is also part of Lakhimpur Lok Sabha constituency. It is a reserved seat for the Scheduled tribes (ST).

Members of Legislative Assembly

Election results

2022 By-election
This by-election was needed as the sitting MLA, Sarbananda Sonowal, resigned to become a member of the Rajya Sabha.

2021

2016

2011

See also

 Majuli
 List of constituencies of Assam Legislative Assembly

Notes

References

External links 
 

Assembly constituencies of Assam
Majuli
Jorhat district